Henry Edward Turner Jr. (May 4, 1842 – June 28, 1911) was an American politician who served as member of the Massachusetts House of Representatives and as Massachusetts Auditor.

Biography
He was born in Boston, Massachusetts on May 4, 1842 to Henry Edward Turner Sr. and Sophronia Ann Burns.

He married Lucinda A. Barrett on July 1, 1863. She died in March, 1865. On December 17, 1867 he married Huldah S. Crowell of Malden, Massachusetts and they had two children, Mrs. Anabel Thorne of Malden and Harry H. Turner of Walla Walla, Washington.

He served as Auditor of the Commonwealth of Massachusetts from 1901 until his death.

He died on June 28, 1911 at his home, 37 Washington street, Malden, Massachusetts.

References

1842 births
Republican Party members of the Massachusetts House of Representatives
State auditors of Massachusetts
Politicians from Boston
1911 deaths
19th-century American politicians